Blacksmith Creek is a stream in Shawnee County, Kansas, in the United States.

Blacksmith Creek was named from a blacksmith shop of the Kaw people.

See also
List of rivers of Kansas

References

Rivers of Shawnee County, Kansas
Rivers of Kansas